Burd & Keyz is a Canadian hip-hop and R&B production group from Markham, Ontario, Canada. Some notable acts they have produced for are Kardinal Offishall, MGK, Meek Mill, Pusha T, and more recently A$AP Ferg, Fabolous, and French Montana.

Music career
Andrew "Burd" Liburd and Anthony "Durty Keyz" James, were raised together in the Toronto suburb of Markham. The two began producing in high school when they discovered a mutual interest in music, specifically in beat-making and production.

In 2004, James and Liburd officially formed the production duo Burd & Keyz.

On June 28, 2010, Keyz died of a bacterial infection called streptococcus. He was only 23 years old. A tribute video was released on July 4, 2010.

Burd still produces music under the name "Burd & Keyz".

Keyz of Life

On December 13, 2011, Burd released a tribute album to Keyz titled Keyz of Life, and offered it as a free download.

The lead single, "LoveSpeak", which featured R&B/Soul Toronto native Shi Wisdom and rapper KJ, was released on June 6, 2011. The video was shot at Wisdom's Barber Shop & Beauty Salon in Toronto's Eglinton West neighbourhood. The video was directed by David F. Mewa.

The second single, "Real Nigga Tears (R.N.T.)", featured Rich Kidd from Toronto and DJ Grouch and was released on August 16, 2011. The video, directed by Sean Getti and featuring Burd himself, was released the next month on September 6, 2011.

The third single, "Faithful", featured Toronto artists Luu Breeze, A-Game, and Jahron B, with co-production from fellow Toronto native T-Minus and was released on October 26, 2011. The video, directed by Reza Dahya, was released on March 12, 2012.

The album received positive reviews and lead to an article about Burd & Keyz on the front page of the National Post arts section  among other reviews. On April 29, 2012, Keyz of Life was officially released in the United Kingdom.

Production

2009

Famous —  Goddess Girl

01. I Wanna Know Your Name (ft Oh!) (Re-Master)

02. Screwface Rap

03. Hater's Eulogy

04. The Declaration

05. Time To Decide

06. Fresh Cut

07. Goddess Girl (ft Luu Breeze & Oh!)

08. How It's Gotta Be (ft Kim Davis)

2010

Nickelus F —  Season Premiere

03. World Renown

2011

Rochester — Born to Be

02. Let My Tape Rock (ft Luu Breeze & K. Ryan)

03. Turn Me On

07. Yuu (Young Luv II)

08. Tek Mi Money (ft Pachino)

11. Triumphant

Luu Breeze — #HollaLaLuuie

03. HollaLaLuuie

04. Bin Laden

Burd & Keyz —  Keyz of Life

01. Divine Brown – Intro (produced by McCallaman)

02. SonReal x Nickelus F x Blake Carrington – Keyz of Life

03. Promise x Redway x Rochester – Say A Prayer

04. Interlude I

05. Luu Breeze x A-Game x PartyNextDoor – Faithful (co-produced with T-Minus)

06. Lokz – Duet

07. Burdstrumental (Never Get Over You)

08. Interlude II

09. Shi Wisdom x KJ – LoveSpeak

10. Burdstrumental (Losing My Bestfriend) (co-produced with McCallaman)

11. Interlude III

12. Rich Kidd x DJ Grouch – R.N.T. (Real Nigga Tears)

13. OmarLunan aka Oh! x Dwayne Morgan x O'Sound – Shine (produced by T-Minus)

14. Divine Brown x Kardinal Offishall – The Other Side

2012

JD Era —  No Handouts

10. I Need You (ft Shi Wisdom)

Kardinal Offishall

00. Ignorant Shit

00. Reppin' 4 My City (ft Wiz Kid)

Peter Jackson —  Fresh Start

10. #1 Fan (ft Karl Wolf)

Troy Ave —  Bricks In My Backpack 3
 
07. Chiddy Chiddy Bang Bang

08. F.U.B.U.

Troy Ave —  White Christmas

15. Red Lipstick (ft Chase N. Cashe)

Chase N. Cashe

00. Watch Me

2013

LA Leakers — LA Leakers Presents: The 2013 Draft Picks

14. I Can Do That (ft Chase N. Cashe)

MGK — Black Flag

03. Peso (ft Meek Mill & Pusha T)

08. 50 (ft French Montana)

The Game — OKE: Operation Kill Everything

16. You Don't Know

SonReal

00. Everywhere We Go

Luu Breeze — City In Gold

03. Show Me Something (Produced with xSDTRK)
04. Say Word
05. Sound Off
06. That Aint You
11. La Rendezvous (ft Andreena Mill & Darryl Riley)

Chase N Cashe — Heir Waves

12. M.D.N.B. (Produced with Chase N Cashe)
15. I Can Do That 

Aion Clarke

00. Ready 

Bonic

00. Cheerios (ft. Dom Kennedy)

2014

Tory Lanez — Lost Cause

09. "Priceless" (produced with Daniel Worthy and Tory Lanez)

GVND - Days Like This - EP

03. Money Right (ft Luu Breeze)

Kirko Bangz — Progression V: Young Texas Playa

03. "For Da 99" (produced with Jordon Manswell)
06. "288" (produced with Jordon Manswell)
08. "Screaming" (ft. Bando Jones) (produced with Sound M.O.B.)
10. "Then I Came Dine" (ft. Riff Raff) (produced with Jordon Manswell and Sevn Thomas)
18. "Pray For Me"

Shi Wisdom — Intervention [EP]

02. Monster 
03. Magic 

Sonreal — One Long Day

07. Nothing Interlude (ft Willa)

2015

Devontee — District Vibe

11. All I Ever Wanted 

Marty Baller

00. Things We Go Through

SonReal — For The Town

06. For The Town

Jazz Cartier — Marauding in Paradise

09. The Downtown Cliche (Produced with Sevn Thomas)

2016

Donnie

00. Come Through (ft Daniel Caesar) 

Derin Falana 
00. The Pick Up (produced with Jordon Manswell and Sevn Thomas)

Kirko Bangz
00. Love and Basketball (produced with The Mekanics)

Ye Ali
00. Used To (ft Pollari)
00. Ye Ali - Late Nite Flexxx (ft Louis Val and Laioung)(produced with Xclu)

A$AP Ferg — Always Strive and Prosper
19. Don't Mind (ft Fabolous and French Montana) (produced with The Mekanics) (Bonus Track)

Luu Breeze — Something in the Shade
02. Came Up

Luu Breeze
00. Lost

J-Soul
00. Richmond Hill (produced with Jordon Manswell)

BZZY — A Part of Everything
14. Stubborn

CJ Fly
00. Raising The Bar (produced with Sevn Thomas)

Audra The Rapper
00. Sometimes (produced with Sevn Thomas and Jordon Manswell)

2017

R. City (Rock City)
00. Who To Trust 

Luu Breeze — LoveDontLiveHere
06. Long Island Ice T (Produced with Jordon Manswell)

Ye Ali — Passion & Patience
03. Closer (Produced with Jordon Manswell)

05. Mixing (ft Johnny Yukon) (Produced with Foreign Tek) 

A1 Bentley
00. Toot That Whoa Whoa! (ft Prince Christian) (Produced with Foreign Tek)

2018

Burd & Keyz 
00. Time to Go (ft 24HRS, Young Troy, and Ye Ali) (Produced with Jordon Manswell)

A1 Bentley
00. Toot That Whoa Whoa! (Remix) (ft Chris Brown, Prince Christian) (Produced with Foreign Tek)

Jazz Cartier — Fleurever

02. Security (Produced with Sean Fischer, Jordon Manswell, Ryan Hemsworth, & Lantz)

2019

Pilla B
00. Big Chopper (ft King Louie)

00. Fuck It Up (Additional production by Joel Chambers)

Donnie —  From The Beginning To The End
07. Life of the Party (ft Daniel Caesar)

2020

Pilla B
00. Vanilla (produced with Joel Chambers & Cloudeyes)

4TUNAT
00. Morning Wake Up

DillanPonders — Because We're Alive
01. Whole New Flex (produced with Joel Chambers)

2021
Kirko Bangz
00. Heart Safe

Awards and nominations

Singles produced

References

Black Canadian musical groups
Canadian hip hop groups
Canadian contemporary R&B musical groups
Record production duos
Canadian musical duos
Hip hop duos
Musical groups from the Regional Municipality of York